The Millennium Dome Show was a multimedia theatrical performance created to commemorate the year 2000 in the Millennium Dome in London, England. The show was directed by Pixar executive Pete Docter, who wrote the show alongside English musician Peter Gabriel and English architect Mark Fisher. 

Fisher designed the show while Gabriel composed the music, later made available as his eleventh studio album OVO. Micha Bergese was the Artistic Director. The show opened on 1 January 2000 and was performed 999 times before closing on 31 December of that year.

The Story of OVO

The Story of OVO was released in the CD-shaped comic book which was part of the CD edition of the studio album OVO with the title "OVO The Millennium Show".

The Romeo and Juliet-like story in the show, serving as an allegory for humanity's unity between nature and technology, revolved around a feud between the "earth-people" and the "sky-people". A young boy from the sky and a young girl from the earth fell in love, but the feud between their people made it difficult for them to meet.  Eventually the earth-people suffered a crushing defeat, which ultimately led them to reconcile and unite with the sky-people. At the end of the show, the lovers flew together into a better future, symbolizing the beginning of the new millennium.

Further reading

References

External links
  Mark Fisher "Millennium Show" stage set design

Events in London
Musicals